Martin Dunn may refer to:

Martin Dunn (cricketer) (1883–1942), Australian cricketer
Martin Dunn (journalist) (born 1955), British journalist
Martin J. Dunn (1956–2020), American lawyer and politician

See also
Martin Dunne (disambiguation)